The Yoknapatawpha darter (Etheostoma faulkneri) is a species of freshwater ray-finned fish, a darter from the subfamily Etheostomatinae, part of the family Percidae. It is endemic to the Yocona River watershed of north-central Mississippi in the United States.

The Yoknapatawpha darter was initially considered to be a unique clade of the Yazoo darter. Based on mitochondrial DNA, it was initially determined that there are two monophyletic clades, those in the Little Tallahatchie River and those in the Yocona River drainages. Further genetic and morphological analyses determined the two populations were different species, with E. raneyi in the Little Tallahatchie River watershed, while the population in the Yocona River watershed was described as a new species, E. faulkneri.

Description

Distribution and habitat
The Yoknapatawpha darter inhabits small, clear, mostly spring-fed streams with substrates that include clay, sand, gravel, or silt. Its range encompasses headwater streams in the Yocona River's watershed, in Lafayette, Yalobusha, and Calhoun counties; it may also occur in southwestern Panola County.

Taxonomy and etymology
Etheostoma faulkneri is named for William Faulkner, a native of Lafayette County, Mississippi. The common name, the Yoknapatawpha darter, is derived from the fictional name given to the Yocona River by Faulkner.

References

Endemic fauna of Mississippi
faulkneri
Fish described in 2020